National Highway 202 (NH 202) is a  National Highway in India  that links Mokokchung to Imphal and runs for a distance of

References

National highways in India
National Highways in Nagaland
202
Mokokchung district